Baie Verte is a  Canadian bay located on the north shore of Nova Scotia and eastern shore of New Brunswick. It is a sub-basin of the Northumberland Strait.

Description
Baie Verte is one of the larger bays of the Northumberland Strait with its northerly limits at Cape Tormentine, a headland located immediately south of the community of Cape Tormentine, and its southerly limits at Aggermore Point, a headland located west of the community of Amherst Shore. It opens directly north and east onto the Northumberland Strait while its northern shore is formed by New Brunswick and its southern shore is formed by Nova Scotia.

Islands
The only island of note is Ephraim Island, located in Upper Cape, New Brunswick.

Marine and wildlife
Baie Verte is home to nesting colonies of sea birds and is a nursery area for fin and shell fishes. Its extensive salt marshes at the western end of the bay create important habitat for wetland animals.

Recreation
The bay supports several recreational areas, primarily at Amherst Shore Provincial Park, Tidnish Dock Provincial Park, and Fort Gaspareaux National Historic Site of Canada.

Communities
The village of Port Elgin is the largest population centre directly fronting the bay. The following communities are located along the bay's shoreline from north to south:

New Brunswick
 Cape Tormentine
 Cape Spear
 Upper Cape
 Bayside
 Timber River
 Port Elgin
 Baie Verte

Nova Scotia
 Tidnish Bridge
 Tidnish Cross Roads
 Lorneville
 Amherst Shore

References

Bays of New Brunswick
Bays of Nova Scotia
Landforms of Cumberland County, Nova Scotia
Landforms of Westmorland County, New Brunswick